The Pskem Mountain Range (Pskemskiy Khrebet) or Piskom Mountains, is a mountain range located within the west Tien Shan range of Central Asia, and is a natural border between Kyrgyzstan and Uzbekistan. The range is a water divide between the Pskem river to the north and the Chandalash, Chatkal, and Koʻksu rivers to the south. The highest elevations are attained in the north-east of the range: Mount Adelung and Mount Beshtor.

The river Pskem flows through the mountains on its way to Lake Charvak.

References

Mountain ranges of Kyrgyzstan
Mountain ranges of Uzbekistan
Tashkent Region
Mountain ranges of the Tian Shan